Saint-Bonnet-près-Riom (literally Saint-Bonnet near Riom; Auvergnat: Sant Bonet de Rioms) is a commune in the Puy-de-Dôme department in Auvergne in central France.

Population

See also
Communes of the Puy-de-Dôme department

References

Saintbonnetpresriom